Saint-Paul-de-l'Île-aux-Noix is a municipality in southern Quebec, Canada located in the administrative area of the Montérégie. The population as of the Canada 2021 Census was 2,141.

Demographics

Population

Language

Education

The South Shore Protestant Regional School Board previously served the municipality.

See also
Ile aux Noix
List of municipalities in Quebec

References

External links

Saint-Paul-de-l'Île-aux-Noix official website

Municipalities in Quebec
Incorporated places in Le Haut-Richelieu Regional County Municipality